"The Expanse" is the fifty-second episode of Star Trek: Enterprise, the twenty-sixth episode of the second season, and the Season Two finale. The episode launched a change of direction for the series, starting with a cataclysmic attack on the Star Trek version of Earth and introducing a new alien foe, the Xindi.

This episode set the foundation for the season-spanning Xindi story arc, encompassing all of Season Three and the first three episodes of Season Four. The story line continues in the Season Three opening episode, "The Xindi".

Plot
In April 2153, an alien probe attacks Earth, cutting a destructive swath 4,000 km long, from Florida to Venezuela, killing millions, including Commander Tucker's younger sister, Elizabeth. Enterprise is recalled to Earth by Admiral Forrest. On the way, Captain Archer is kidnapped by the Suliban Cabal. He accuses the Suliban leader, Silik, of being responsible for the Earth attack, but Silik professes ignorance. The Cabal's sponsor, a vague and shadowy holographic human from the distant future, informs Archer about the Temporal Cold War and the Xindi, the race that attacked Earth. He claims the Xindi have been told by another Cold War faction that their home-world will be destroyed, in 400 years, by Humans.

Nearing the Sol system, Enterprise is again ambushed, attacked by a Klingon Bird of Prey commanded by Captain Duras at the behest of the Klingon High Council. Fortunately, three other Starfleet vessels arrive, forcing it to retreat. Archer relates his encounters to Starfleet and the Vulcan High Command, and it is clear that the Xindi of the present are pre-empting the destruction of their home-world in the future. Ambassador Soval is dubious of Archer's temporal war argument, and tries to dissuade him from venturing into the Delphic Expanse(where they traced the Xindi probe's origin), a dangerous section of space that once destroyed the Vulcan ship Vaankara.

Archer, acting on advice from the shadowy informant, scans the crashed probe, revealing a component with an unmistakable date stamp placing the date of construction at 420 years in the future. Starfleet orders Archer to take Enterprise to the Expanse to try to stop the Xindi. Starfleet refits the Enterprise with improved weapons, shields, and a detachment of MACOs (Military Assault Command Operations soldiers) are stationed aboard for the mission.

Ambassador Soval informs T'Pol that her assignment on Enterprise has been terminated by the High Command, who deem this to be purely a human matter. T'Pol logically points out that if they needed a Vulcan on the Enterprise before, they are in greater need now, so her assignment should be continued. She debates, but does not disobey. Enterprise begins their journey towards the Expanse, and to return T'Pol to Vulcan. They are again attacked by Duras, but Archer retaliates using his new torpedoes at 10% and then 50% strength. The Klingon warbird limps away. T'Pol reveals she has resigned from the Vulcan High Command and wishes to stay on the ship. After she tells Archer that "you need me", the detour to Vulcan is cancelled.

After a three-month journey, Enterprise nears the Expanse and is again attacked by Duras. Archer decides to use the 100% setting on his torpedoes, and Duras' ship is destroyed. The Enterprise continues on into the Delphic expanse.

Production 
The episode was written Rick Berman and Brannon Braga. It was directed by Allan Kroeker, who also directed the previous season finale "Shockwave".

Reception 
In 2016, Radio Times ranked the Xindi attack on Earth, the 45th greatest scene of all Star Trek film and television productions. They note the event re-energized the show and launched a season long story arc. They note, "Then came a cliffhanger episode that began with a devastating sight: an alien probe cutting a swathe of destruction across Earth.

In 2019, Den of Geek said this was an important episode for understanding T'Pol.

Awards
This episode was nominated for the 2003 Emmy Award for Outstanding Special Visual Effects for a Series.

Novelization

A novelized adaptation of the episode by J.M. Dillard was published as The Expanse by Pocket Books in trade paperback format in October 2003. The novel also adapted the following episode, "The Xindi".

Home media release 
This episode was released for home media use on DVD as part of the second series box set of Star Trek: Enterprise. Season Two was released on Blu-ray Disc August 20, 2013.

References

External links
 
  

Star Trek: Enterprise (season 2) episodes
2003 American television episodes
Fiction set in the 26th century
Television episodes written by Rick Berman
Television episodes written by Brannon Braga